The 1942 United States Senate election in Texas was held on November 3, 1942. Incumbent Democratic U.S. Senator W. Lee "Pappy" O'Daniel was re-elected to a second term. 

O'Daniel, who had only been elected to the seat in a special election the year before, narrowly fended off a primary challenge from former Governor James V. Allred. He won the general election with only nominal opposition. The Republican Party, now at its nadir in the state, did field a token candidate but did not factor in the election.

Democratic primary

Candidates
James V. Allred, Judge of the U.S. District Court for the Southern District of Texas and former Governor (1935–39)
Daniel Moody, former Governor of Texas (1927–31)
W. Lee O'Daniel, incumbent Senator since 1941
Floyd Ryan

Declined 

 Lyndon B. Johnson, U.S. Representative and candidate for US Senate in 1941 (ran for re-election)

Results

Runoff

General election

O'Daniel won every county in the state with over 65% of the vote. Callahan and Denton counties failed to report their results to the Texas Secretary of State in time to be canvassed, so their results are not included in the official vote totals.

Results

See also 
 1942 United States Senate elections

References

Texas
1942
Senate